Brookside is an unincorporated community and coal town in  Harlan County, Kentucky, United States.

A post office called Brookside was established in 1930, and the name was changed to Ages-Brookside in 1975.

References

Unincorporated communities in Harlan County, Kentucky
Unincorporated communities in Kentucky
Coal towns in Kentucky